The Old Jewish Cemetery of Split, Croatia is located on Marjan hill overlooking the city. Established in 1573, the cemetery currently contains some 700 tombstones, the oldest one dating from 1717. The tombstones are of the horizontal Sephardic type.

Notable graves

 Vid Morpurgo (1838–1911), a Dalmatian industrialist, publisher, politician and member of a notable Split family Morpurgo

See also
 Split Synagogue
 History of the Jews in Croatia

References

Jewish cemeteries
Jewish Croatian history
16th-century establishments in Croatia
Buildings and structures in Split, Croatia